Gina Ochsner (born 1970) is an American author best known for her story collection The Necessary Grace to Fall, which won the Flannery O'Connor Award in 2001, and her novel The Russian Dream Book of Colour and Flight (2009).

She is a graduate of George Fox University, in Newberg, Oregon, and holds a master's degree from Iowa State University.

Her first published story was "Feldspar's Rock Shop" in the Dog River Review, Volume 13, No. 1 (1994), under the pseudonym (maiden name) G. Withnell.

In 2018, Ochsner made an appearance on Storytellers Telling Stories, reading her story, "Elegy in Water".. Her story "Soon the Light" was included in The Best American Short Stories 2022.

References

American women writers
Living people
1970 births
George Fox University alumni
Iowa State University alumni
Writers from Oregon
21st-century American women